The second Government of Prime Minister Edi Rama was the 66th ruling Government of the Republic of Albania which was officially mandated by the President on 13 September 2017. Following the 2017 election, the Socialist Party won a majority of seats to Parliament and had the right to form the government without the need of a coalition.

Changes from Previous Cabinet
The previous government was reduced in size and now it consists of 11 ministries and 2 Ministers without portfolio. Half of the cabinet consists of female ministers. This was a reduction from a previous cabinet with 16 ministries and 3 ministers without portfolio.

The Ministry for Europe and Foreign Affairs absorbed the Ministry of European Integration and the Ministry of Infrastructure absorbed the Ministry of Energy. The Ministry of Finance and Economy took on some of the responsibilities from the dissolved Ministry of Economic Development, Tourism, Trade and Enterprise. Other responsibilities were taken on by the Ministry of Environment, which was renamed. The Ministry of Social Welfare and Youth was dissolved and its roles divided between the Ministry of Health and the Ministry of Education and Sport.

Two "Ministers of State" were created for Diaspora and for Entrepreneurs.

Cabinet reshuffle
On December 28, 2018, PM Edi Rama reshuffled his cabinet with half of his ministers out, in response to the protests that have exposed the scale of popular discontent with his rule. Most Ministers were replaced by the vice ministers.

The cabinet reshuffle consisted of the Vice Prime Minister office, Ministry of Education, Ministry of Infrastructure, Ministry of Economy, Ministry of Foreign Affairs, Ministry of Culture, Ministry of Agriculture and Ministry for Entrepreneurs.

Cabinet
The second Rama Government on the day he took office consisted of 13 ministers, not including the Prime Minister and the Deputy Prime Minister. Among them, were two ministers without portfolio named "Minister of State" who will be joined by two others at the end of the term.

Notes

References

External links
 Council of Ministers Official website

G66
2017 establishments in Albania
Ministries established in 2017
Cabinets established in 2017